Tom Galligan (1891–1965) was an American cinematographer. He was active on Poverty Row in the 1930s for a variety of different companies, particularly for Allied Pictures.

Selected filmography

 The Galloping Ghost (1931)
 The Lightning Warrior (1931)
 Vanity Fair (1932)
 Cowboy Counsellor (1932)
 The Local Bad Man (1932)
 The Stoker (1932)
 Officer Thirteen (1932)
 A Parisian Romance (1932)
 A Man's Land (1932)
 The Boiling Point (1932)
 Unholy Love (1932)
 File 113 (1933)
 One Year Later (1933)
 Laughing at Life (1933)
 The Dude Bandit (1933)
 The Wolf Dog (1933)
 The Intruder (1933)
 The Iron Master (1933)
 A Shriek in the Night (1933)
 The Eleventh Commandment (1933)
 When Strangers Meet (1934)
 Cheaters (1934)
 Take the Stand (1934)
 Once to Every Bachelor (1934)
 The Pecos Dandy (1934)
 Picture Brides (1934)
 Boots of Destiny (1937)
 Trailing Trouble (1937)
 Captain Calamity (1938)
 King of the Sierras (1938)

References

Bibliography
 Pitts, Michael R. Poverty Row Studios, 1929–1940: An Illustrated History of 55 Independent Film Companies, with a Filmography for Each. McFarland & Company, 2005.

External links

1891 births
1965 deaths
American cinematographers